Fight Life is a feature-length documentary on the sport of mixed martial arts. The film is directed by independent filmmaker James Z. Feng and produced by RiLL Films. The film focuses on the lives of professional mixed martial arts fighters outside the cage, primarily profiling Jake Shields, and Lyle Beerbohm. The film unveils the sport of mixed martial arts and what it takes to be a modern-day professional fighter.  Many notables MMA stars and experts are featured in this film, including: Nick Diaz, Gilbert Melendez, Chuck Liddell, Frank Shamrock, Miesha Tate, John McCarthy, Julianna Pena, Michael Chiesa, Herschel Walker, Sam Sheridan, Mark Coleman, Tyron Woodley, Ryan Schultz, Matt Lindland, Mike Swick, and Cody McKenzie. In 2013, Fight Life went on to win the Best Documentary Award at the United Film Festival.

Content
Starring different fighters in different points in their careers, Fight Life brings you a spectrum of different point of views in the fight game. From the 15 long minutes inside the cage to the countless hours in the gym, this profession of mixed-martial arts has finally flourished into mainstream America. The evolution of the sport within the last ten years from an underground sport to Spike TV and CBS has brought MMA into the category of professional sport. Along with this new sport comes the lifestyle of professional fighters who are paving the way for the next big thing. Fight Life chronicles the early struggles of the sport of MMA through the lives of selected fighters. Focusing on our three main protagonists' lives both inside and outside of the ring, the behind the scenes view of both the triumphant and inglorious times the fighters go through in their daily lives. From the moment of victory every fighter is chasing after, to the devastating knockout in defeat, Fight Life follows these fighters during their journey chasing a dream few dare.

Production
A self-funded independent production, filming took place from 2008 to 2011 all across the country.

Release
The film was released in 2012.

References

External links

2012 films
Mixed martial arts documentaries
2010s English-language films